Bayankhangai (Rich Khangai) is a sum of Töv Province in Mongolia. Khangai provident lord, munificent king, generous gracious lord or bountiful king

Districts of Töv Province